Sweet Jesus, Preacherman is a 1973 American blaxploitation action film directed by Henning Schellerup and written by John Cerullo, M. Stuart Madden and Abbey Leitch. The film stars Roger E. Mosley, William Smith, Michael Pataki, Tom Johnigarn, Joe Tornatore and Damu King. The film was released on May 25, 1973, by Metro-Goldwyn-Mayer.

Plot
Holmes is a hitman who has nailed one victim after another. Having iced a large number of them, he is sent by his boss Martelli to infiltrate a section of the black quarter of the inner city. To do this, he becomes Reverend Lee, a Baptist preacher who comes to the local church to preach. Finding that other thugs are there, he decides to take the entire section for himself.

Cast
Roger E. Mosley as Holmes / Lee
William Smith as Martelli
Michael Pataki as State Senator Sills
Tom Johnigarn as Eddie Stoner
Joe Tornatore as Joey
Damu King as Sweetstick
Marla Gibbs as Beverly Solomon
Sam Laws as Deacon Greene
Phil Hoover as George Orr
Paul Silliman as Roy
Chuck Lyles as Detroit Charlie
Norman Fields as Police Captain
Della Thomas as Foxey
Amentha Dymally as Mrs. Greene
Patricia Edwards as Marion Hicks
Chuck Douglas Jr. as Lenny Solomon
Vincent LaBauve as Bobby Thompson
Chuck Wells as Eli Stoner
Betty Coleman as Maxine Gibbs
Lou Jackson as Randy Gibbs
Lillian Tarry as Mother Gibbs
T.C. Ellis as Earl Saunders
Lee Frost as 1st Policeman
Joanne Bruno as Widow Foster (as Jo Ann Bruno)
K.D. Friend as Funeral Minister 
Gordon James as Restaurant Hood
Billy Quinn as Sweetstick's Bodyguard

See also
 List of American films of 1973

References

External links
 

1973 films
American action films
1973 action films
Metro-Goldwyn-Mayer films
Blaxploitation films
1970s English-language films
Films directed by Henning Schellerup
1970s American films